Simon Bon (1 February 1904 – 17 June 1987) was a Dutch rower. He competed at the 1924 and 1928 Summer Olympics in the men's eight and coxless four, respectively, but failed to reach the finals.

His son Piet was also an Olympic rower.

References

1904 births
1987 deaths
Dutch male rowers
Olympic rowers of the Netherlands
Rowers at the 1924 Summer Olympics
Rowers at the 1928 Summer Olympics
People from Liesveld
European Rowing Championships medalists
Sportspeople from South Holland
20th-century Dutch people